The Mariupol uezd was one of the subdivisions of the Yekaterinoslav Governorate of the Russian Empire. It was situated in the southeastern part of the governorate. Its administrative centre was Mariupol.

Demographics
At the time of the Russian Empire Census of 1897, Mariupolsky Uyezd had a population of 254,056. Of these, 46.1% spoke Ukrainian, 19.0% Greek, 14.0% Russian, 7.5% German, 6.1% Tatar, 4.1% Yiddish, 2.1% Turkish, 0.7% Belarusian and 0.2% Polish as their native language.

References

 
Uyezds of Yekaterinoslav Governorate
Yekaterinoslav Governorate